The Fremont Powerhouse is a power plant located in the Umatilla National Forest in Grant County, west of Granite, Oregon, United States.

History
The Fremont Powerhouse used to power to the Red Boy Mine, creating electricity from water supplied by Olive Lake. Eastern Oregon Power and Light acquired the plant in 1911. In 1940 the plant transferred to California-Pacific Utilities Co.; the company operated Fremont until it was shut down in October 1967. The plant stopped generating electricity but remained a tourist attraction, drawing thousands of visitors. In 1993, the building's roof collapsed. In 1999, a former Fremont employee and members of the National Guard of the United States rebuilt much of the building. Fremont was re-dedicated on July 24, 2001. Umatilla National Forest, which owns the structure, received an award from the Oregon State Historic Preservation Office.

See also

 National Register of Historic Places listings in Grant County, Oregon

References

1908 establishments in Oregon
Buildings and structures completed in 1908
Buildings and structures in Grant County, Oregon
Energy infrastructure on the National Register of Historic Places
Former hydroelectric power plants in the United States
Historic districts on the National Register of Historic Places in Oregon
National Register of Historic Places in Grant County, Oregon
Romanesque Revival architecture in Oregon
Hydroelectric power plants in Oregon
Former power stations in Oregon